Real Life is a 2004 Greek drama film written and directed by Panos H. Koutras.

Plot

Aris, 27 years old, returns home after a long absence. His mother, a rich, eccentric and lonely woman lives with her secretary, Sylvia and her loyal gardener Christos, who is mute, in a house famous both for its view in Acropolis and for its swimming pool, supposed to be the deepest in Europe. As Aris falls in love with a poor girl, Alexandra, and confronts his past, a wildfire threatens Athens.

Cast
Nikos Kouris - Aris
Themis Bazaka - Kalliga
Marina Kalogirou - Alexandra
Maria Panouria - Sylvia
Anna Mouglalis - Joy
Yiannis Diamantis - Hristos

References

External links

Official site in Greek

2004 drama films
2004 films
2000s Greek-language films
Greek drama films